Marcel Bürge (born 28 March 1972 in Arbon) is a Swiss rifle shooter. He competed at the 2012 Summer Olympics, where he placed 14th in the 50 m rifle prone event and 11th in the 50 m rifle three positions event.

References

1972 births
Living people
Swiss male sport shooters
Olympic shooters of Switzerland
Shooters at the 2004 Summer Olympics
Shooters at the 2008 Summer Olympics
Shooters at the 2012 Summer Olympics
People from Arbon
Sportspeople from Thurgau